DI.FM (formerly known as Digitally Imported) is an Internet radio broadcaster consisting of over 90 channels dedicated to electronic music, such as house, trance, techno, drum and bass, and dubstep. DI.FM broadcasts handpicked selections consisting of classic, new and up-and-coming hits, as well as weekly and monthly mixed shows from professional DJs. It was founded in December 1999 as a hobby project by Ari Shohat in his Binghamton University dorm room and was one of the first Internet radio stations. It has often been listed as one of the top internet radio stations.

During the 2000s, DI.FM participated in a number of protests against high royalty fees for Internet radio. In July 2009, Digitally Imported, radioIO and AccuRadio reached a revenue-sharing deal with royalty collector SoundExchange securing music rights. It also licenses out its own proprietary streaming platform to power other internet radio sites such as RadioTunes (formerly sky.fm), 
JazzRadio, RockRadio, ClassicalRadio and ZenRadio.

Channels
Source:

 00s club hits
 Ambient
 Atmospheric breaks
 Bass & jackin' house
 Bassline
 Big beat
 Big room house
 Breaks
 ChillHop
 Chillout
 Chillout dreams
 Chillstep
 Chill & tropical house
 Classic eurodance
 Classic eurodisco
 Classic trance
 Classic vocal trance
 Club dubstep
 Club sounds
 Dark DnB
 Dark psytrance
 Deep house
 Deep nu-disco
 Deep tech
 Detroit house & techno
 Disco house
 DJ mixes
 Downtempo lounge
 Drum and bass
 Drumstep
 Dub
 Dubstep
 Dub techno
 EDM festival
 EDM hits
 Electro house
 Electronic pioneers
 Electropop
 Electro swing
 Epic trance
 Eurodance
 Funky house
 Future bass
 Future garage
 Future synthpop
 Gabber
 Glitch hop
 Goa-psy trance
 Hands up
 Hardcore
 Hard dance
 Hardstyle
 Hard techno
 House
 Indie beats
 Indie dance
 Jungle
 Jazz house
 Latin house
 Liquid DnB
 Liquid dubstep
 Liquid trap
 Lo-fi hip hop
 Lounge
 Melodic progressive
 Minimal
 Nightcore
 Nu disco
 Oldschool acid
 Oldschool house
 Oldschool rave
 Oldschool techno & trance
 Progressive
 Progressive psy
 Psybient
 Psychill
 Russian club hits
 Soulful house
 Space dreams
 Synthwave
 Tech house
 Techno
 Trance
 Trap
 Tribal house
 UMF radio
 Underground techno
 Vocal chillout
 Vocal house
 Vocal lounge
 Vocal trance

Notes

References

See also
 List of internet radio stations

External links
 
 RadioTunes.com
 JAZZRADIO.com
 Rock Radio
 Classical Radio
 Zen Radio

Internet radio
Internet radio in the United States
Internet properties established in 1999
Android (operating system) software
BlackBerry software
IOS software
1999 establishments in Colorado